Laura Pyper is a Northern Irish actress, known for portraying Ella Dee in the second season of Hex, Jane Fairfax in Emma and Lexine Murdoch in the video game Dead Space: Extraction. She also played Lesley Howell in The Secret on ITV, which was first broadcast in April and May 2016.

Background
Born in Magherafelt, Northern Ireland, Pyper has two brothers and two sisters. She attended Rainey Endowed School and later studied English and Drama at Trinity College, Dublin.

Career
Pyper made her film debut playing Lin in Reign of Fire, a role she won while still studying. She has also appeared in the Irish film Headrush, playing Vicky Nobel.

On television, Pyper played Ella Dee in the second season of the Sky One supernatural drama Hex, and Jane Fairfax in the 2009 BBC adaptation of Jane Austen's Emma. She has also guest starred in episodes of Demons, Doctors, Silent Witness, The Bill and Bachelors Walk.

Pyper has also worked as a voice actor in the video game Dead Space: Extraction, playing the character of Lexine Murdoch.

Pyper's theatre credits include Don Juan in Soho at the Donmar Warehouse and Blackwater Angel at the Finborough Theatre. In 2009 she played Cressida in the first full-scale Shakespeare's Globe production of Troilus and Cressida. In 2010 she played Lily Cahill in the revival of Punk Rock. She played Laurel in Douglas Hodge's production of Torch Song Trilogy at the Menier Chocolate Factory in 2012, Mrs Manningham in Gas Light at Salisbury Playhouse in 2014 and Beatrice in A View from the Bridge at York Theatre Royal and Royal & Derngate in 2019.

Filmography

Theatre 
 Blackwater Angel - Finborough Theatre, February - March 2006 (playing Lizzie Maher)
 Don Juan in Soho - Donmar Warehouse, November 2006 - February 2007 (playing Elvira)
 Troilus and Cressida - Shakespeare's Globe, July - September 2009 (playing Cressida)
 Punk Rock - Lyric Hammersmith and tour, September - November 2010 (playing Lily Cahill)
 Torch Song Trilogy - Menier Chocolate Factory, May 2012 (playing Laurel)
Gas Light - Salisbury Playhouse, March 2014 (playing Mrs Manningham)
A View from the Bridge - York Theatre Royal and Royal & Derngate, September - October 2019 (playing Beatrice)

References

External links
 
 Laura Pyper fansite

Television actresses from Northern Ireland
Film actresses from Northern Ireland
Stage actresses from Northern Ireland
Living people
People from Magherafelt
Alumni of Trinity College Dublin
People educated at Rainey Endowed School
1980 births